The large-footed tapaculo (Scytalopus macropus) is a species of bird in the family Rhinocryptidae. It is endemic to Peru.

Taxonomy and systematics

Unlike many other tapaculos, the large-footed tapaculo has been treated as a species since it was described. It is monotypic.

Description

It is the largest species of genus Scytalopus. The adult is uniformly very dark gray. The juvenile is paler than the adult, but still dark gray. The feathers of the juvenile's upperparts are tipped with dark brown and those of the underparts with buff or off-white.

Distribution and habitat

The large-footed tapaculo is found only in the central Andes of Peru, from southern Amazonas Department south to Junín Department. It primarily inhabits mossy undergrowth along streams in elfin forest and cloud forest.

Behavior

No information has been published about the large-footed tapaculo's diet or its foraging and breeding behaviors.

The large-footed tapaculo's song is "a monotonous series of...notes...usually terminating with a different (normally higher) note." .

Status

The IUCN has assessed the large-footed tapaculo as being of Least Concern. However, it has a restricted range, is very poorly known, and occurs in only one protected area.

References

large-footed tapaculo
Birds of the Peruvian Andes
Endemic birds of Peru
large-footed tapaculo
large-footed tapaculo
Taxonomy articles created by Polbot